Mustapha Anane (1950, in Larbaâ Nath Irathen – October 21, 2010), was a former Algerian international footballer who spent his entire career with JS Kabylie.

Personal
Anane was born in the town of Larbaâ Nath Irathen and grew up in the Lalla Saïda district of Tizi Ouzou, where he started playing football in the streets of his neighborhood.

Club career
At age 14, Anane joined the junior ranks of JS Kabylie. Four years later, the coach of the senior team, Ali Ben Fedda, promoted him into the squad where he made his debut in a friendly against Soviet side Dinamo Minsk. He made his official debut for the club in a match against ES Guelma, where he scored two goals in a 3-2 loss. Anane was a member of the JSK team that won promotion to the top flight in 1969. He went on to win the league title four times during his time with the club : 1973, 1974, 1977 and 1980. In 1977, he also won the Algerian Cup beating NA Hussein Dey in the final.

In 1980, Anane played his last game for JSK against AS Vita Club in the 1978 African Cup of Champions Clubs. He decided to retire after that due to an injury he had picked up during a friendly in France. He continued playing in the local amateur league with AS Tizi Ouzou, which he would also go on to coach.

International career
Despite being a regular member of the Algerian National Team, Anane had just two caps for the team, playing in friendlies against Hungary and Albania.

Managerial career
After his playing career, Anane coached the junior and senior teams of local club AS Tizi Ouzou, as well as other clubs in the Kabylie region such as Les Issers, and his birthplace, Larbaâ Nath Irathen. He then became a manager with JS Kabylie and was also in charge of the junior team.

Death
On October 21, 2010, Anane died in the early hours of the day at Tizi Ouzou. He was buried the same day in the town's M'douha Cemetery.

Honours
 Won the Algerian Championnat National four times with JS Kabylie in 1973, 1974, 1977, 1980
 Won the Algerian Cup once with JS Kabylie in 1977

References

1950 births
2010 deaths
People from Larbaâ Nath Irathen
Kabyle people
Algerian footballers
Algeria international footballers
JS Kabylie players
Association football midfielders
21st-century Algerian people